This is a list based on comics. It includes films that are adaptations of comics, and those films whose characters originated in those comics.

English, French, Japanese
As some languages and forms have been extensively adapted into films, they have their own entries:
 List of films based on English-language comics
List of films based on Dark Horse Comics
List of films based on DC Comics
List of films based on Marvel Comics
List of films based on Image Comics
List of films based on Harvey Comics
List of films based on Archie Comics
List of films based on French-language comics
List of films based on manga

Other languages

Basque
Black Is Beltza (2018)
 (2022)
 (2011)
Irati (2022)

Chinese (Cantonese)
Black Mask
Black Mask (1996)
Black Mask 2: City of Masks (2002)
Dragon Tiger Gate (2006)
Feel 100% (1996)
Feel 100%... Once More (1996)
Feel 100% II (2001)
Feel 100% 2003 (2003)
A Man Called Hero (1999)
Storm Rider Clash of the Evils (2009)
The Storm Riders (1998)
The Storm Warriors (2009)
Young and Dangerous (1996)

Chinese (Mandarin)
Go Away Mr. Tumor (2015)
A Jewish Girl in Shanghai (2010)
Rock Dog (2015)
Zombie Brother (TBA)

Czech
Alois Nebel (2011), from White Brook, Main Station and Golden Hills
The Cunning Little Vixen:
The Cunning Little Vixen (1995) 
The Cunning Little Vixen (2003) 
 (2013)
Pepina Rejholcová (1932)
 (1993), from Rychlé šípy

Danish
Far til fire:
Father of Four (1953)
Father of Four in the Snow (1954)
Father of Four in the Country (1955)
Father of Four in the City (1956)
Father of Four and Uncle Sofus (1957)
Father of Four and the Wolf Cubs (1958)
Father of Four on Bornholm (1959)
Far til fire med fuld musik (1961)
 (1971)
 (2005)
 (2006)
 (2008)
 (2010)
 (2011)
 (2012)
 (2014)
 (2015)
 (2017)
 (2018)
 (2020)
Journey to Saturn (2008)
Poeten og Lillemor:
The Poet and the Little Mother (1959)
Poeten og Lillemor og Lotte (1960)
Poeten og Lillemor i forårshumør (1961)
 (2002)
Valhalla:
Valhalla (1986), based on volumes one, four and five of the comic book series
Valhalla (2019)

Dutch

Dick Bos (Netherlands):
Inbraak (1942)
 (1943)
Moord in het Modehuis (1946)
The Dragon That Wasn't (Or Was He?) (Netherlands, 1983), based on Tom Puss and Oliver B. Bumble
Kapitein Rob en het Geheim van Professor Lupardi (Netherlands, 2007), based on Kapitein Rob
De Kiekeboes (Belgium):
 (1992)
 (2000)
 (Belgium, 1968), based on Jommeke
Sjors & Sjimmie (Netherlands):
Sjors van de Rebellenclub met vacantie (1940)
Sjors van de Rebellenclub (1955)
Sjors en Sjimmie op het Pirateneiland (1962)
 (1966)
Sjors en Sjimmie in het Land der Reuzen (1968)
Sjors en Sjimmie en de Toverring (1971)
Sjors en Sjimmie en de Rebellen (1972)
Sjors en Sjimmie en het Zwaard van Krijn (1977)
Spike and Suzy (Belgium):
 (2004)
Luke and Lucy: The Texas Rangers (2009)
De Terugkeer van de Wespendief (Netherlands, 2017)
De wederopstanding van een klootzak (Netherlands, 2013)

Filipino

12 Kuba (1963)
 (1968)
Alyas Palos (1961)
 (1959)
Anak ng Kidlat (1959)
Mga Anghel sa Lansangan (1959)
Apat na Agimat (1962)
Asintado (1959)
Asiong Aksaya:
Asiong Aksaya (1977)
 (1979)
Eto na naman si Asiong Aksaya! (1980)
Asyang ng La Loma (1963)
Atorni Agaton:
Atorni Agaton: Agent Law-ko (1969)
Atorni Agaton: Abogadong de kampanilya (1990)
Atsay (1978)
Baby Face (1959)
Barok:
Barok (1976)
Sabi barok lab ko dabiana (1978)
Tatay na barok (1979)
Barok Goes to Hong Kong (1984)
Basahang Ginto (1952)
Mga Batang Bangketa (1970)
Mga Batikan (1964)
Bella Bandida (1971)
Berdugo (1960)
Bitter Sweet (1969)
Ang biyenang hindi tumatawa (1954)
 (1966)
Boksingera (1956)
Bondying:
Bondying (1954)
Tatay Na si Bondying (1955)
Ato ti Bondying (1973)
Mars Ravelo's Bondying: The Little Big Boy (1989)
Captain Barbell:
 (1964)
Captain Barbell Kontra Captain Bakal (1965)
Captain Barbell Boom! (1973)
Captain Barbell (1986)
 (2003)
Cleopakwak (1969)
Cofradia (1953)
Dalmacio Armas (1983)(serialized in People's Journal: Carlo J. Caparas)
Darna:
Darna (1951)
 (1952)
Si Darna at ang Impakta (1963)
Isputnik vs. Darna (1963)
Darna at ang Babaing Tuod (1965)
Darna at ang Planetman (1969)
 (1973)
 (1973)
Darna vs The Planet Women (1973)
Darna, Kuno? (1979)
Bira, Darna, Bira! (1979)
Darna and Ding (1980)
Darna (1991)
 (1994)
Dayukdok (1961)
Dimasalang (1970)
Dingdong (1970)
The Dormitory (1971)
Double Cross (1960)
Durando (1971)
Duwag ang Sumuko (1964)
Dyesebel:
 (1953)
 (1964)
Dyesebel at Ang Mahiwagang Kabibe (1973)
Sisid, Dyesebel, Sisid (1978)
Dyesebel (1990)
Dyesebel (1996)
 (1959)
Galo Gimbal (1968)
Ang Gangster at ang Birhen (1972)
Ging (1964)
Gorgonya (1978)
Gorio at Tekla (1953)
Guido Mortal (1970)
Gumuhong bantayog (1960)
Hagibis (1947), based on Hagibis
Harangan Man ng Sibat (1961)
Hiram na Mukha (1992)
Hugo, the Sidewalk Vendor (1962)
I Believe (1961)
Ifugao (1954)
Isinumpa (1959)
Kadenang Putik (1960)
Kaibigan Ko'ng Sto. Niño (1967)
Kalabog en Bosyo:
 (1959)
Kalabog en Bosyo Strike Again (1986)
Kalabog en Bosyo (1994)
Kambal tuko (1952)
Ang Kampana sa Santa Quiteria (1971)
 (1974)
Kapit sa Patalim (1962)
Kapitan Tornado (1962)
Kenkoy (1950), based on Kenkoy
Kurdapya (1950)
Kwatang: A Star Is Born (1967)
Lastikman:
Lastik Man (1965)
Lastikman (2003)
Lastikman: Unang Banat (2004)
Ang Lihim ni Gagamba (1964)
Ang Limbas at ang Lawin (1967)
Linda Mora (1959)
Little Lucy (1961)
Lupa sa lupa (1960)
Magnong Mandurukot (1963)
Markado (1960)
Masikip ang Daigdig (1962)
Ang Maton (1959)
Ngitngit ng pitong Whistle Bomb (1968)
Octavia (1961)
Paano Ba ang Mangarap? (1983)
Padre Valiente (1971)
Pambihirang Tatlo (1969)
Panagupa (1969)
Panday:
Ang Panday (1980)
Pagbabalik ng Panday (1981)
Ang Panday: Ikatlong Yugto (1982)
Ang Panday IV: Ika-Apat Na Aklat (1984)
Dugo ng Panday (1993)
Ang Panday (2009)
Ang Panday 2 (2011)
Paula (1969)
Pedrong Hunyango (1965)
Pieta (1983)
Pistolero (1966)
Pitong Gatang (1959)
Pitong Sagisag (1961)
Pobresita (1959)
Pomposa (1968)
Pusakal (1957)
Ripleng de Rapido (1963)
Roberta (1951)
Rolling Rockers (1959)
Rosa Rossini (1959)
Rowena (1969)
Sakay and Moy (1963)
Sakristan Mayor (1961)
Sandra (1959)
Ang Sawa sa Lumang Simboryo (1952)
Sibad (1967)
Sidra (1966)
La Sombra: Ang Anino (1966)
Sugapa (1963)
Super Gee (1973)
Tacio (1963)
Tagisan ng mga Agimat (1965)
Talahib (1963)
Talusaling (1955)
Tanikalang Apoy (1959)
Tatak (1959)
Tatlong Baraha (1961)
Tatlong Magdalena (1960)
Thor (1962)
Tiagong Lundag (1966)
Tisoy:
Tisoy (1969)
Tisoy! (1977)
Tough Guy (1959)
Tubog sa Ginto (1971)
Tuko sa Madre Kakaw (1959)
Tulisan (1962)
Uhaw (1970)
Ukala: Ang walang suko (1954), based on Ukala
Vengativo (1961)
El Vibora (1972)
Zsa Zsa Zaturnnah, ze Moveeh (2006)
Zuma:
 (1985)
Anak ni Zuma (1988)

Finnish
 (2019), based on Fingerpori
Pekka and Pätkä:
Pekka Puupää (1953)
 (1953)
 (1954)
 (1955)
 (1955)
 (1955)
 (1957)
 (1957)
 (1957)
Pekka ja Pätkä Suezilla (1958)
 (1958)
 (1959)
 (1960)
 (1985)
 (1986)

German

 The Abrafaxe – Under The Black Flag (2001)
 Der bewegte Mann (1994)
  (2018), from Endzeit
 Globi und der Schattenräuber (2003), from Globi (Switzerland)
 Killer Condom (1996)
 :
  (1997) 
  (2006) 
  (2001), from 
 Lisístrata (2002)
  (1958), from Lilli
 Max and Moritz:
 Spuk mit Max und Moritz (1951)
 Max and Moritz (1956)
  (1965)
  (1978)
 Nick Knatterton:
 Nick Knatterton’s Adventure (1959)
  (2002) 
  (Switzerland, 2017)
  (1950)
 
  (2017)
  (2018)
 Werner:
 Werner – Beinhart! (1990)
  (1996)
  (1999)
  (2003)
  (2011)

Hindi
Sons of Ram (2012)
Motu Patlu in Wonderland! (2012, TV film)
Savita Bhabhi (2013, Web film)
Motu Patlu: In Alien World! (2016, TV film)
Motu Patlu: King of Kings (2016)
Motu Patlu in the City of Gold (2018)

Indonesian
  (2019), from Eggnoid (comics) 
 Gundala Putra Petir:
  Gundala (2019)  
  (1981)  
  (2019)

Italian

 5 Is the Perfect Number (2019)
  (1988)
 Avenger X (1967), from 
 Baba Yaga (1973), from Valentina 
 La Banda Grossi (2018), from Il brigante Grossi e la sua miserabile banda 
  (1982), from Biancaneve 
 Courageous Captain Swing (1971), from Comandante Mark 
 Corto Maltese:
 Corto Maltese: The Ballad of the Salt Sea (2002) 
 Corto Maltese in South America (2002) 
 Corto Maltese: Heads and Mushrooms (2002) 
 Corto Maltese: Celtic Suite (2002) 
 Corto Maltese and the Ethiopian (2002) 
  (2002) 
 Corto Maltese and the Gilded House of Samarkand (2002) 
 The Click (1985), from Clic
 Dampyr (2022), from Dampyr
Diabolik
 Danger: Diabolik (1968)
 Diabolik (2021)
 Diabolik - Ginko all'attacco! (2022)
 Dylan Dog:
 Dylan Dog: Dead of Night (2011)
 Cemetery Man (1994)
  (2014, short film)
 Estigmas (2010), from Stigmate by Lorenzo Mattotti
 Isabella:
 Ms. Stiletto (1969)
 Zenabel (1969) 
 I'm Still Alive (TBA)
 Jesuit Joe (1991)
 Kriminal:{{
 Kriminal (1966) 
 Il marchio di Kriminal (1968) 
 The Last Man on Earth (2011), from Nessuno mi farà del male 
 Monolith (2016)
  (1992), from magazine Tango "Nudi e Crudi" 
 :
  (2011) 
 Catacomba (2016) 
 Deep Red (1975)  (episode:il grido del capricorno )
 Murder Obsession (1981)  (episode:il grido del capricorno ) 
  (1997), from Butterscotch
 Paz! (2002), from Massimo Zanardi
 Princess Cinderella   (1941), from Signor Bonaventura
 La profezia dell'armadillo (2018)
 Satanik (1968), from Satanik 
 Sturmtruppen:
 Sturmtruppen (1976)
  (1982) 
  (1977) 
  (2021)
 Tex and the Lord of the Deep (1985), from Tex 
 Thrilling (one episode) (1965), from Sadik
 Zagor:
 Zagor - Kara Bela (1971)
 Zagor kara korsan'in hazineleri (1971)
 Zora the Vampire (2000), from Zora

Korean

 26 Years (2012)
 APT (2006)
 BA:BO (2008), from BA:BO
 Beat (1997)
 Blade of the Phantom Master (2004)
 Blades of Blood (2010)
 The Cat Funeral (2015)
 Dasepo Naughty Girls (2006)
 Fashion King (2014)
 Fists of Legend (2013)
 The Five (2013)
 Le Grand Chef (2007)
 Le Grand Chef 2: Kimchi Battle (2010)
 Hello, Schoolgirl (2008)
 Inside Men (2015)
 Late Blossom (2011)
 Moss (2010)
 Mr. Go (2013)
 The Neighbor (2012)
 Pained (2011)
 Secretly, Greatly (2013)
 So I Married An Anti-fan (2016)
 Tazza: The Hidden Card (2014)
 Tazza: The High Rollers (2006)
 Timing (2014)

Luxembourgish

 (2018)

Malayalam
Bobanum Moliyum (1971)

Norwegian

Bustenskjold (1958)
Free Jimmy (2006)
Ninjababy (2021)

Polish

 George the Hedgehog (2011), from Jeż Jerzy
 (2002)

Portuguese
 O Doutrinador (Brazil, 2018)
  (Brazil, 1973)
O Menino Maluquinho (Brazil):
  (1995)
  (1997)
Monica's Gang (Brazil):
 As Aventuras da Turma da Mônica (1982)
 A Princesa e o Robô (1983)
 Cine Gibi: O Filme (2004)
 Monica's Gang in an Adventure in Time (2007)
 Turma da Mônica: Laços (2019)
  (2021)
 O Quim e o Manecas (Portugal, 1916), from O Quim e o Manecas
 Rocky & Hudson (Brazil, 1994)
  (Brazil, 2018)
 Wood & Stock: Sexo, Orégano e Rock'n'Roll (Brazil, 2006)
 Yakuza Princess (2021), from Samurai Shirô (Brazil)

Russian
 Major Grom (2017, short film)
 Major Grom: Plague Doctor (2021)

Serbian

 Billy the Spit (1986)
 City Cat (1991), TV short from Cat Claw
 Mirko i Slavko (1973)
 Technotise: Edit & I (2009), from Technotise

Spanish

 Alma Grande (Mexico):
 Alma Grande (1966)
 Alma Grande en el desierto (1967)
 Anacleto: agente secreto  (Spain, 2015)
  (Spain, 1995)
 Las aventuras de Hijitus (Argentina, 1973)
 Aventuras de Molécula y el Canguro Boxy (Spain, 1976)
 Las Aventuras de Pinín y sus amigos (Spain, 1979)
 Avivato  (Argentina, 1949)
   (Argentina, 1979)
 Birdboy: The Forgotten Children (Spain, 2015)
 Boogie  (Argentina, 2009)
 Boystown  (Spain, 2007)
 Buñuel in the Labyrinth of the Turtles  (Spain, 2018)
 Calzonzin Inspector (Mexico, 1973)
 El caballero del antifaz (Spain, 2010)
 El Capitán Trueno y el Santo Grial (Spain, 2011)
 Cazador (Argentina):
  (2019)
  (Mexico):
 Chanoc (1967)
 Chanoc en las garras de las fieras (1970)
 Chanoc en las tarántulas (1971)
 Chanoc contra el tigre y el vampiro (1972)
 Chanoc en el foso de las serpientes (1974)
 Chanoc en la isla de los muertos (1975)
 Chanoc en el circo union (1979)
 Chanoc y el hijo del Santo contra los vampiros asesinos (1981)
 La clínica del Dr. Cureta (Argentina, 1987)
 Condorito: La Película (Chile, 2017)
 Don Fulgencio (Argentina, 1950)
 Dream Team (Spain):
  (France, 2019)
 Fúlmine (Argentina, 1949)
 Gaturro (Argentina, 2010)
 Goomer (Spain, 1999)
  (Mexico):
 Hermelinda Linda (1984)
  (1986)
  (Spain):
 Historias de la puta mili (1993)
 La muerte de Arensivia (2005)
  (2007), from Isidoro Cañones (Argentina)

 Lindor Covas, el cimarrón (Argentina, 1963)
 Mafalda  (Argentina, 1982)
  (Spain):
  (1992)
  (1993)
 Marco Antonio: Rescate en Hong Kong (Spain, 2000)
 María Isabel (Mexico):
 María Isabel (1967)
  (1968)
 María y yo (Spain, 2010)
 Memorias de un hombre en pijama (Spain, 2019)
 Mort & Phil (Spain):
 Mort and Phil's First Festival (1969)
 Mort and Phil's Second Festival (1969)
 Mortadelo & Filemon: The Big Adventure (2003)
 Mortadelo and Filemon. Mission: Save the Planet (2008)
 Neuroworld (Spain, 2014)
 Ogu and Mampato in Rapa Nui (Chile, 2002)
 Pancho Talero (Argentina):
  (1929)
  (1930)
 Pancho Talero en Hollywood (1931)
 El Payo (Mexico):
 El Payo - Un hombre contra el mundo (1972)
 Los caciques (1975)
 La montaña del diablo (1975)
  (Argentina):
 Patoruzito (2004)
 Patoruzito: La gran aventura (2006)
 Percal (Mexico):
  (1951)
  (1951)
  (1951)
 Piantadino (Argentina, 1950)
 Polar (Spain, 2019)
 Las puertitas del Sr. López (Argentina, 1988)
 Rarotonga (Mexico, 1978)
 Rubí (Mexico, 1970)
 The Silent War (Spain, 2019)
 Superlópez (Spain):
 Superlópez (2003, short film)
 Superlópez (2018)
 Los Supersabios (Mexico, 1978)
 Tigre Callejero (Spain, 2021)
 Virus Tropical (Columbia, 2017)
 Wrinkles (Spain, 2011)
 Yesenia (Mexico, 1971)
 Yor, the Hunter from the Future (Argentina, 1983)
 Zipi y Zape (Spain):
  (1981)
 Zip & Zap and the Marble Gang (2013)
 Zip & Zap and the Captain's Island (2016)
  (Mexico, 1958)

Swedish

:
 (1971) 
 (1972) 
Alena (2015)
Bamse:
Bamse and the Thief City (2014)
Bamse and the Witch's Daughter (2016)
 (2018)
 (2021)
Biffen och Bananen:
Biffen och Bananen (1951)
Blondie, Beef and the Banana (1952)
 (1957)
Eva & Adam:
 (2001)
 (2021)
Harald Handfaste (1946)
Kronblom:
 (1947) 
 (1949) 
Mandel Karlsson:
 (1946) 
91:an Karlssons permis (1947) 
 (1951)
 (1953)
 (1955)
 (1957)
 (1959)
 (1977)
Moomins on the Riviera (Finland, 2014), based on the Moomin comic strips
 (1950)
 (2007)
We Are the Best! (2013)

Thai

 13 Beloved (2006)
 13 Sins (2014)
 Noo Hin: The Movie (2006)

Turkish
Bad Cat (2016)
Kara Murat Şeyh Gaffar'a Karşı (1976)
Karaoğlan:
Karaoğlan – Altay'dan Gelen Yiğit (1965)
Karaoğlan – Baybora'nın Oğlu (1966)
Karaoğlan – Camoka'nın İntikamı (1966)
Karaoğlan – Bizanslı Zorba (1967)
Karaoğlan – Yeşil Ejder (1967)
Karaoğlan – Samara Şeyhin Kızı (1969)
Karaoğlan Geliyor (1972)
Karaoğlan (2013) 
The Last Ottoman (2007)

Malkoçoğlu (1966)
Malkoçoğlu: Krallara Karşı (1967)
Malkoçoğlu: Kara Korsan (1968)
Malkoçoğlu: Akıncılar Geliyor (1969)
Malkoçoğlu Cem Sultan (1969)
Malkoçoğlu: Ölüm Fedaileri (1971)
Malkoçoğlu: Kurt Bey (1973) 
Tarkan:
 (1969)
 (1970)
Tarkan Versus the Vikings (1971)
 (1972)
 (1973)

See also
 Superhero film
 List of American superhero films
 List of comic-based films directed by women
 List of films based on comic strips
Also related:
 Lists of film source material
 List of comics based on films
 List of films based on fiction works
 List of films based on radio series
 List of films based on television programs
 List of television programs based on comics

References

Footnotes

Sources

External links

Comics2Film
Superheroes Lives
ComicScreen : Les super héros crèvent l'écran
From Page to Screen: Captain Zorikh's list of comic book movies
Comic Years:  Films Based on Comics